Cornel Cernea (born 22 April 1976) is a Romanian goalkeeping coach and former professional footballer who played as a goalkeeper. In his career, Cernea played for teams such as Petrolul Ploiești, Oțelul Galați, Steaua București or Unirea Alba Iulia, among others.

Club career
Cernea played for Grivița IRA until 1997, when he joined the Divizia B team Minerul Motru. In 1999, he returns to Grivița IRA but after only few weeks joins Petrolul Ploiești and makes Divizia A debut. In 2003, he joins Oțelul Galați for a couple of seasons, before being bought by Steaua București in 2005 for a fee of €75,000. His last team being Progresul Bucuresti he retired in 2014.

Honours

Club

Petrolul Ploiești
 Divizia B: 2002–2003

Steaua București
 Divizia A: 2005–2006
 Supercupa României: 2006

External links
 
 
 

1976 births
Living people
People from Ialomița County
Romanian footballers
Association football goalkeepers
Liga I players
Liga II players
CS Minerul Motru players
FC Petrolul Ploiești players
ASC Oțelul Galați players
FC Steaua București players
CSM Unirea Alba Iulia players
CS Brănești players
FC Unirea Urziceni players
FCV Farul Constanța players